Guardsman is a military rank.

Guardsman may also refer to:

 Guardsman (comics), the armored character in Marvel Comics
 The Guardsman (1925 film), a 1925 Austrian film
The Guardsman, a 1931 film 
Son of the Guardsman, 1946 film
The Grenadier, the first name given to this public house
ST Guardsman, tugboat
 a soldier of the Guards Division of the British Army